Luosha Township is a township in Leye County, Guangxi, China. , it administers the following eleven villages:
Renlong Village
Shanzhou Village
Hanji Village
Taiping Village
Dangxiong Village
Jiulong Village
Tangying Village
Quanda Village
Luowa Village
Longnan Village
Huanglong Village

References 

Townships of Guangxi
Leye County
Towns and townships in Baise